Eli Kaneti is an Israeli basketball coach.

Eli Kaneti coached Maccabi Tel Aviv in 1993 and Kiryat Motzkin in 1999.  He coached Bnei Herzliya in 2002, but was replaced mid-season by assistant coach Israel Lev, after the team experienced a losing streak.

In 2007, he coached Hapoel Galil Elyon. In 2011, he was brought back to coach the team, replacing Oded Katash.

References

Living people
Israeli basketball coaches
Maccabi Tel Aviv B.C. coaches
Hapoel Galil Elyon
Year of birth missing (living people)